The EU three, also known as EU big three, EU triumvirate, EU trio or simply E3, refers to France, Germany and Italy, a group that consists of the three large founding members of the European Union.

It had also been used to refer to the grouping of France, Germany, and the United Kingdom, especially during the negotiations with Iran from 2003.

EU-3 (EU founding states)

Activities
Germany, France and Italy were part of the original Inner Six founders of the EU along with Benelux nations.

Negotiations for greater integration in the EU
Determined to keep the European project intact in the wake of the UK's vote to leave the European Union in 2016, France, Germany and Italy called for greater integration in various trilateral summits in Berlin, Paris and Ventotene.
More recently France, Germany and Italy have agreed a common position about the Paris climate agreement they have led a  draft EU law to restrain Chinese acquisitions of European firms and technologies and they lead the EU sanctions on North Korea.

Statistics

EU-3 (largest economies in the EU until UK left)
The UK joined the European communities in 1973 and voted to leave in 2016, formally withdrawing from the EU in 2021.

Negotiations with Iran

In 2003, France, Germany and the UK launched negotiations attempting to limit the Iranian nuclear program, which led to the Tehran Declaration of 21 October 2003 and the voluntary Paris Agreement of 15 November 2004.

EU 3 + 3, more commonly referred to as the E3+3, refers to a grouping which includes the EU-3 and China, Russia, and the United States. It was coined when these states joined the EU diplomatic efforts with Iran in 2006. In the United States and Russia, it is more commonly known as P5+1, which refers to the five permanent members of the UN Security Council plus Germany.

Italy took part in a number of these meetings between 2006 and 2007. In 2014, under the request of the Italian PM Matteo Renzi, Foreign Minister Federica Mogherini was named High Representative of the EU as the negotiations approached a conclusion and came to an end with the elaboration of the Joint Comprehensive Plan of Action in 2015.

See also 

 Big Four (Western Europe)
 EU-15
 European balance of power
 Inner Six
 Iran–European Union relations
 Visegrád Group

References

External links 
 EU calls for UN action over Iran, BBC News, 12 January 2006
 

Geography of the European Union
France and the European Union
Germany and the European Union
United Kingdom and the European Union
Italy and the European Union